is a town located in Aomori Prefecture, Japan. , the town had an estimated population of  10,812 in 4645 households, and a population density of 130 persons per km². The total area of the town is

Geography
Rokunohe is in east-central Aomori Prefecture, in relatively flat lands. The Oirase River, which originates from Lake Towada, flows through the southern part of the town from east to west.The central and northern part is a plateau called Sanbonkibara, and the Inogawa (Sanbonkibara irrigation canal), which branches off from the Oirase River at Towada City, flows eastward.

Neighboring municipalities
Aomori Prefecture
Misawa
Towada
Tōhoku
Oirase
Gonohe

Climate
The town has a humid climate characterized by cool short summers and long cold winters with heavy snowfall (Köppen climate classification Cfa). The average annual temperature in Rokunohe is 9.7 °C. The average annual rainfall is 1201 mm with September as the wettest month. The temperatures are highest on average in August, at around 22.6 °C, and lowest in January, at around -2.2 °C.

Demographics
Per Japanese census data, the population of Rokunohe has remained relatively stable over the past 50 years.

History
Rokunohe began as one of a series of fortified settlements established by the Nanbu clan in the early Kamakura period to control their new territories in Nukada District of northern Ōshū, although the area never developed into an independent village. During the Edo period, the area was controlled by Morioka Domain, becoming part of the territory assigned to Shichinohe Domain in the later half of the Edo period. During the post-Meiji restoration establishment of the modern municipalities system on 1 April 1889,  Rokunohe Village was proclaimed from the merger of seven small hamlets. On February 1, 1948, a portion of Rokunohe was merged into neighboring Misawa. The remaining portion of Rokunohe was elevated to town status on October 1, 1957.

Economy
The economy of Rokunohe is heavily dependent on agriculture and stock raising. Primary crops include rice, Japanese yam, carrots and garlic.

Education
Rokunohe has three public elementary schools and two public middle schools operated by the town government. The town has one public high school operated by the Aomori Prefectural Board of Education.

Transportation

Railway
The Towada Kankō Electric Railway Line, which had following five stations in the town, was discontinued in 2012. Since that time, Rokunohe has not had any passenger railway service.
  -  -  -  - .

Highway
 Kamikita Expressway
 Second Michinoku Toll Road

Local attractions
Komaki onsen
Kumano Jinja (claimed to have been founded in 844 AD)

Noted people from Rokunohe
Tatsuya Araidai – professional karate athlete

References

External links

Official Website 

 
Towns in Aomori Prefecture